John Booth may refer to:

Politicians
John Booth (Lancashire politician) (died 1422), Member of Parliament (MP) for Lancashire
John Booth (Appleby politician), MP for Appleby in 1421
John Booth (Derby politician), MP for Derby in 1432
John Booth (Weobley politician), MP for Weobly in 1679
John Booth (1822–1898), member of the New South Wales Legislative Assembly for West Sydney and East Macquarie
John David Booth (1951–2011), member of the New South Wales Legislative Assembly for Wakehurst
John Paton Booth (1837–1902), politician in British Columbia, Canada

Others
John Booth (architect) (1759–1843), British architect
John Booth (motor racing) (born 1954), former team principal of Marussia F1 Team
John Booth (bishop) (died 1478), churchman and Bishop of Exeter
John Booth (rugby league), English rugby league footballer who played in the 1940s and 1950s
John Rudolphus Booth (1827–1925), Canadian lumber and railway baron
John Wilkes Booth (1838–1865), American actor and assassin of US President Abraham Lincoln
John Hunter Booth (1886–1971), American playwright
John Stanley Booth (1919–1958), English aviator
John Booth (Australian footballer) (born 1942), Australian rules footballer
 John Booth (magician) (1912–2009), American professional magician and writer on the history of magic performance

See also
Jack Booth (1918–1999), Australian rules footballer
Booth (surname)